Tristan Wirfs (born January 24, 1999) is an American football offensive tackle for the Tampa Bay Buccaneers of the National Football League (NFL). He played college football at Iowa.

High school career
Wirfs played high school football at Mount Vernon High School, where he also excelled in wrestling and track and field. He won the state discus throw as a sophomore, and Iowa State and Iowa Hawkeyes both offered Wirfs scholarships within the next month. He committed to Iowa in winter of his junior year in December 2015, and was a four-star recruit. During his senior year of high school, Wirfs helped Mount Vernon to a state semifinal appearance in football, was named an Army All-American for football, won a state wrestling title in winter after cutting 30 pounds, and won the discus for the third straight year and shot put for the second straight year in spring at the Iowa state track-and-field championship meet. He was honored by the Des Moines Register as the best boys prep athlete in the state.

College career
As a true freshman, Wirfs started seven games at right tackle, becoming the first true freshman to start at offensive tackle in the Kirk Ferentz era. Through the season, he worked on being more aggressive against defenders.

Before his sophomore season, Wirfs was suspended for the season-opening game against Northern Illinois for an OWI arrest in late July. 
After his sophomore season, Wirfs broke the Hawkeyes hang clean record held by Brandon Scherff, setting the new mark at 450 pounds. He also said a focus of his junior season would be to translate his weight room exploits to the field. An injury during spring practice caused Wirfs to miss a few weeks of practice.  Following his junior season where he was selected to the First Team All Big Ten and named the conference lineman of the year, Wirfs announced that he would forgo his final season and enter the 2020 NFL Draft.

Professional career

Wirfs was drafted by the Tampa Bay Buccaneers in the first round with the 13th overall pick in the 2020 NFL Draft.

2020 season
As a rookie, Wirfs started all 16 games in the 2020 season, only allowing 1 sack to Khalil Mack of the Chicago Bears in Week 5. Wirfs played and started all four games in the Buccaneers' playoff run that resulted in the team winning Super Bowl LV.

2021 season
Wirfs started all 17 games for the Buccaneers, before suffering an ankle injury in the Wild Card round of the playoffs that kept him out the remainder of the Buccaneers' 2021 season. After another strong year performance wise Wirfs was named to his 1st career Pro Bowl, as well as garnered a 1st-Team All-Pro selection.

References

External links
Tampa Bay Buccaneers bio
Iowa Hawkeyes bio

1999 births
All-American college football players
American football offensive tackles
Iowa Hawkeyes football players
Living people
People from Mount Vernon, Iowa
Players of American football from Iowa
Tampa Bay Buccaneers players
National Conference Pro Bowl players